Luka Vučko (born 11 April 1984, in Split) is a Croatian retired footballer who played as a defender.

Career

Club
A product of HNK Hajduk Split, Vučko had stints with Prva HNL sides Hajduk Split and NK Rijeka, after before moving to Süper Lig side Eskişehirspor in July 2008.

In February 2011, he joined Polish club Lechia Gdańsk on a half-year deal. He rescinded his contract in 2012 by mutual consent.

In September 2012, he joined Hungarian club (Pécsi MFC) for 2 years.

In February 2013, he joined North American Soccer League club San Antonio Scorpions FC.

International
Vučko also earned 19 caps for Croatia U21 team between 2004 and 2006. He was called up to the national team on 11 May 2010 by manager Slaven Bilić, as a replacement for Dario Knežević, for the May 2010 friendlies against Austria, Wales and Estonia. The game against Estonia, in which he came on as a 46th-minute substitute for Dejan Lovren, remained his sole international appearance.

Personal life
He is a younger brother of former Croatia international player Jurica Vučko.

References

External links
 
 
 Luka Vučko profile at Nogometni magazin 

1984 births
Living people
Footballers from Split, Croatia
Association football defenders
Croatian footballers
Croatia under-21 international footballers
Croatia international footballers
HNK Hajduk Split players
NK Solin players
FC Saturn Ramenskoye players
HNK Rijeka players
Eskişehirspor footballers
Lechia Gdańsk players
Pécsi MFC players
San Antonio Scorpions players
NK Istra 1961 players
NK Mosor players
Croatian Football League players
Süper Lig players
Ekstraklasa players
North American Soccer League players
Croatian expatriate footballers
Expatriate footballers in Russia
Croatian expatriate sportspeople in Russia
Expatriate footballers in Turkey
Croatian expatriate sportspeople in Turkey
Expatriate footballers in Poland
Croatian expatriate sportspeople in Poland
Expatriate footballers in Hungary
Croatian expatriate sportspeople in Hungary
Expatriate soccer players in the United States
Croatian expatriate sportspeople in the United States